Spikeout: Digital Battle Online is a 3D beat 'em up video game developed by Toshihiro Nagoshi, and released by Sega for their Model 3 Step 2.1 arcade system board in 1998. An update, Spikeout: Final Edition, was released in 1999.

A follow-up, Slashout, which was a slash 'em up set in a medieval fantasy setting, was developed and released in 2000, also for arcades. A spinoff, Spikers Battle, adding a versus fighting element, was developed and released in 2001, again for arcades. Another follow-up, Spikeout: Battle Street, was developed by Dimps and released exclusively for the Xbox in 2005.

The SpikeOut games bear a resemblance to Sega's earlier Streets of Rage series.

Reception 
In Japan, Game Machine listed SpikeOut on their November 15, 1998 issue as being the third most-successful arcade game of the month.

References

External links
SegaRetro.org - SpikeOut

1998 video games
Amusement Vision games
Fighting games
Sega arcade games
Sega Games franchises
Arcade video games
Arcade-only video games
Sega beat 'em ups
Video games developed in Japan
3D beat 'em ups
Video games scored by Hidenori Shoji